Mouaouia Meklouche (born 3 November 1990) is an Algerian footballer who plays as a midfielder for MC Alger in the Algerian Ligue Professionnelle 1, on loan from USM Alger.

International career
On 29 September 2010 Meklouche was called up to the Algerian Under-23 national team by head coach Azzedine Aït Djoudi for a friendly against Qatar. In November 2010, he was called up again for a friendly against Tunisia. He was also a member of the team for the 2010 UNAF U-23 Tournament.

References

External links
 
 

1990 births
Living people
Footballers from Algiers
Algerian footballers
Algeria under-23 international footballers
USM Alger players
MC Alger players
Algerian Ligue Professionnelle 1 players
RC Arbaâ players
Association football midfielders
21st-century Algerian people